Chang Nuea is a village and tambon (sub-district) in Mae Mo District, in Lampang Province, Thailand. In 2005 it had a population of 5,336. The tambon contains six villages.

References

Tambon of Lampang province
Populated places in Lampang province